Melitaea solona is a butterfly of the family Nymphalidae. It is found in the Tian Shan mountains, Tibet, Alai and Trans-Alay regions.

Subspecies
Melitaea solona solona (eastern Tian Shan, western Tibet)
Melitaea solona filipjevi Churkin, Kolesnichenko & Tuzov, 2000 (northern Tian Shan: Zailiisky Alatau Mountains)
Melitaea solona plyushchi Churkin, Kolesnichenko & Tuzov, 2000 (central Tian Shan: Sary-Dzhaz, Kokshaal-Tau)
Melitaea solona pletnevi Churkin, Kolesnichenko & Tuzov, 2000 (eastern Alai, Inner Tian Shan)
Melitaea solona evadne Hemming, 1934 (eastern Transalai)

References

S
Butterflies of Asia
Insects of Central Asia
Tian Shan
Butterflies described in 1881